Gordan Golik (born 4 March 1985 in Varaždin) is a Croatian football midfielder currently playing for NK Tehničar 1974.

Club career
Golik came up through his hometown youth academy, Varteks, where he captained the team in all youth levels. Golik started his senior career with the Varteks in the 2003–04 season, playing in the top level Prava HNL. He moved to Poland to play with Lech Poznań in 2008, returning to his Croatian club, renamed NK Varaždin, in 2011. After a few more moves, Golik returned to his hometown in 2017, when he signed with a new NK Varaždin, unassociated with the organization he started his career with, which folded in 2015.
Golik now plays for NK Međimurec Dunjkovec-Pretetinec, where he has been since 2018.

International career
He also has 4 caps for the Croatia U19 team, which he earned in 2003, all of them in the friendly matches.

References

External links
 

1985 births
Living people
Sportspeople from Varaždin
Association football midfielders
Croatian footballers
Croatia youth international footballers
NK Varaždin players
Lech Poznań players
NK Zavrč players
NK Međimurje players
NK Vinogradar players
NK Varaždin (2012) players
Croatian Football League players
Ekstraklasa players
Slovenian Second League players
Second Football League (Croatia) players
Croatian expatriate footballers
Expatriate footballers in Poland
Croatian expatriate sportspeople in Poland
Expatriate footballers in Slovenia
Croatian expatriate sportspeople in Slovenia